Spectrophobia (derived from Latin: spectrum, n. specio, an appearance, form, image of a thing; an apparition, spectre) or catoptrophobia (from Greek κάτοπτρον kátoptron, "mirror") is a kind of specific phobia involving an abnormal and persistent fear of mirrors, and an anxiety about seeing one's own face reflected in them. It is sometimes related to the fear of ghosts or the undead.

This phobia is distinct from eisoptrophobia, which is the fear of one's own reflection. Sufferers of spectrophobia can fear the breaking of a mirror bringing extreme bad luck. They can fear the thought of something frightening jumping out of the mirror, or seeing something disturbing inside of it next to their own reflection when looking directly at it. Others fear that it is a link to the preternatural world or a gateway into another world, and may fear being pulled into the mirror by some preternatural force. Some also fear their own reflection in the darkness, as it can appear distorted in strange ways or their reflection may frighten them.

References

Phobias
Mirrors